The Woxo Principle is the second studio album by Australian funk band Swoop. The album was released in November 1995 and peaked at number 51 on the ARIA Charts.

Band member Roland Kapferer said "We don't turn our nose up at any style of music... The strength of our record is that it doesn't sound like anything else you'll hear at the moment".

At the ARIA Music Awards of 1996, the album was nominated for ARIA Award for Best Pop Release, losing out to "Where the Wild Roses Grow" by Nick Cave & Kylie Minogue.

Reception
Simon Wooldridge from Juice Magazine said "Swoop have contrived a cheesy amalgam of funk/rock/disco/pop on The Woxo Principle, and they've put it together with enough skill to make overlooking the amount of second hand riffage totally painless."

Track listing

Charts

Release history

References

1995 albums
Mushroom Records albums